Henrik Hajós (later Guttmann, 21 July 1886 – 30 December 1963) was a Hungarian freestyle swimmer who competed in the 1906 Intercalated Games and the 1908 Summer Olympics. He was born and died in Budapest and was the younger brother of Alfréd Hajós.

In 1906 he won a gold medal as a member of Hungarian 4x250 m relay team. Two years later at the 1908 Olympics he was eliminated in the semi-finals of the 400 metre freestyle event. In the 100 metre freestyle competition he was eliminated in the first round.

References

 

1886 births
1963 deaths
Hungarian male swimmers
Hungarian male freestyle swimmers
Olympic swimmers of Hungary
Swimmers at the 1906 Intercalated Games
Swimmers at the 1908 Summer Olympics
Swimmers from Budapest
Austro-Hungarian Jews
Jewish Hungarian sportspeople
Jewish swimmers
Medalists at the 1906 Intercalated Games
19th-century Hungarian people
20th-century Hungarian people